Ion Baciu (born 12 May 1944) is a retired bantamweight Greco-Roman wrestler from Romania. He won the world title in 1967 and a silver medal at the 1968 Olympics, placing sixth in 1972.

References

External links 

 

1944 births
Living people
Olympic wrestlers of Romania
Wrestlers at the 1968 Summer Olympics
Wrestlers at the 1972 Summer Olympics
Romanian male sport wrestlers
Olympic silver medalists for Romania
Olympic medalists in wrestling
Medalists at the 1968 Summer Olympics
European Wrestling Championships medalists
World Wrestling Championships medalists